Medhal is an instrumental form in Turkish makam music or Ottoman classical music. The first piece in Medhal form was composed by Ali Rıfat Çağatay. Most of the Medhal compositions are in short usuls like Sofyan. Two basic forms are used: i) A+B+C+B+D+B+E+B , ii) A+B+C+B, where B refers to the section "Mulazime".

Compositions in for Medhal (Turkish makam music)
Below is a list of some compositions in for Medhal.

Rast Medhal (Alâeddin Yavaşça)
Rast Medhal (Ali Rıfat Çağatay)
Rast Medhal (Sadun Aksüt)

References

Forms of Turkish makam music
Forms of Ottoman classical music